Michalina Łabacz (born 1992 in Suwałki, Poland) is a Polish actress.  Łabacz starred in the film Volhynia.

Łabacz won the Best Debut Actor award at the 2017 Polish Film Festival.

Łabacz studied at  The Aleksander Zelwerowicz National Academy of Dramatic Art in Warsaw.

References

External links

1992 births
Living people
People from Suwałki
21st-century Polish actresses